Kalpataru (born in 1937 as K Parvez) was an Indian film director best known for several hit movies such as Ghar Dwaar, Khoon Ka Badla Khoon, Ghar Ghar Ki Kahani and Bade Ghar Ki Beti.He was known for his melodramatic family dramas.

He died at a hospital in Santacruz West on 17 May 2015 at the age of 78. He is survived by his wife and two daughters.

Filmography 
 1998 Phool Aur Faulad
 1996 Chhota Sa Ghar
 1994 Ghar Ki Izzat
 1993 Ghar Ki Laaj
 1993 Badi Bahen
 1992 Naseebwaala
 1992 Rishta To Ho Aisa
 1992 Humshakal (as Kalptaru)
 1990 Ghar Ho To Aisa
 1989 Apna Ghar
 1989 Paraya Ghar
 1989 Bade Ghar Ki Beti (as Kalptaru)
 1988 Ghar Ghar Ki Kahani
 1987 Ghar Ka Sukh
 1986 Maa Beti
 1985 Ghar Dwaar
 1983 Hamar Bhauji
 1980 Parabesh
 1980 Paribesh
 1978 Khoon Ka Badla Khoon (as K. Parvez)
 1977 Tinku (as K. Parvez)
 1973 Dhamkee (as K. Parvez)
 1972 Do Bachche Dus Haath (as K. Parvez)
 1967 Chhaila Babu (as K. Parvez)
 1967 Duniya Nachegi (as K. Parvez)
 1963 Dekha Pyaar Tumhara (as K. Parvez)
 1963 Kahin Pyaar Na Ho Jaaye (as K. Parvez)
 1961 Salaam Memsaab (as K. Parvez)
 1958 Mr. Q (as K. Parvez)

References 

2015 deaths
1937 births
20th-century Indian film directors